Epuyén  is a village and municipality in Chubut Province in southern Argentina.

Geography

Climate 
Using the 0 °C isotherm, the climate of this town is humid continental with Mediterranean influence (Dfb/Dsb, according to the Köppen climate classification), bordering on an oceanic climate (Cfb) and a cool-summer Mediterranean climate (Csb).

References

Populated places in Chubut Province